HD 21278 is a binary star system in the constellation Perseus, located within the  million year old Alpha Persei Cluster. It has a blue-white hue and is visible to the naked eye with a combined apparent visual magnitude of 4.99. The system is located at a distance of approximately 580 light years from the Sun based on parallax, and it is drifting further away with a radial velocity of +1.20 km/s.

The binary nature of this star was announced in 1925 by Otto Struve. It is a double-lined spectroscopic binary with an orbital period of 21.7 days and an eccentricity of 0.12.

The primary component is a B-type main-sequence star with a stellar classification of B5V, indicating it is generating energy through core hydrogen fusion. The star is spinning with a projected rotational velocity of 75 km/s. It has 4.6 times the mass of the Sun and about 3.9 times the Sun's radius. HD 21278 is radiating 940 times the luminosity of the Sun from its photosphere at an effective temperature of 15,274 K.

References

B-type main-sequence stars
Spectroscopic binaries
Alpha Persei Cluster

Perseus (constellation)
BD+48 920
021278
016147
1034